The 1922 Tennessee Volunteers football team (variously "Tennessee", "UT" or the "Vols") represented the University of Tennessee in the 1922 college football season. Playing as a member of the Southern Conference (SoCon), the team was led by head coach M. B. Banks, in his second year, and played their home games at Shields–Watkins Field in Knoxville, Tennessee. The 1922 Vols won eight games, lost two, and tied zero (8–2 overall, 3–2 in the SoCon). Playing all but two games at home, the Volunteers outscored their opponents 239 to 45 and posted four shutouts.

Schedule

References

Tennessee
Tennessee Volunteers football seasons
Tennessee Volunteers football